Force Command Northern Areas is a division size formation of the Pakistan Army. It commands the troops deployed in the Northern Areas of Pakistan. It is a component of X Corps of the Pakistan Army. In contrast to the general belief that it is a corps sized formation, it is a division sized force commanded by a major general. Its coat of arms is a snow leopard on a black background.

Present Day Order of Battle

References 

FCNA
Military in Gilgit-Baltistan
Military units and formations established in the 1940s